Second-seeded Billie Jean King defeated Margaret Court in the final, 6–1, 6–2 to win the women's singles tennis title at the 1968 Australian Championships. Nancy Richey was the defending champion but did not compete that year.

Seeds
The joint first seeds received a bye into the second round.

  Lesley Turner (semifinals)
  Billie Jean King (champion)
  Rosie Casals (quarterfinals)
  Judy Tegart (semifinals)
  Kerry Melville (third round)
  Kathleen Harter (quarterfinals)
  Mary-Ann Eisel (third round)
  Margaret Court (final)
  Elena Subirats (second round)
  Karen Krantzcke (quarterfinals)
  Ada Bakker (first round)
  Gail Sherriff (third round)
  Helen Gourlay (first round)
  Lorraine Robinson (withdrew)

Draw

Finals

Top half

Section 1

Section 2

Bottom half

Section 3

Section 4

External links

Women's Singles
1968
1968 in women's tennis
1968 in Australian women's sport